Gwon Ik-hyeon (19 February 1920 – 2002) was a South Korean racing cyclist. He competed at the 1948 and 1952 Summer Olympics.

References

External links

1920 births
2002 deaths
South Korean male cyclists
Olympic cyclists of South Korea
Cyclists at the 1948 Summer Olympics
Cyclists at the 1952 Summer Olympics
Place of birth missing